Paolo Lorenzi was the defending champion but chose not to defend his title.

Dudi Sela won the title after defeating Jan-Lennard Struff 3–6, 6–4, 6–3 in the final.

Seeds

Draw

Finals

Top half

Bottom half

References
Main Draw
Qualifying Draw

Canberra Challenger - Singles